Ireland was represented by The Swarbriggs, with the song "That's What Friends Are For", at the 1975 Eurovision Song Contest, which took place on 22 March in Stockholm. "That's What Friends Are For" was chosen as the Irish entry at the national final on 9 February.

Before Eurovision

National final 
The final was held at the studios of broadcaster RTÉ in Dublin, hosted by Mike Murphy. For a second year, RTÉ pre-selected their representatives and The Swarbriggs performed eight songs which were voted on by ten regional juries.

At Eurovision 
On the night of the final The Swarbriggs performed second in the running order, following the Netherlands and preceding France. At the close of voting "That's What Friends Are For" had picked up 68 points (including a maximum 12 from Belgium), placing Ireland 9th of the 19 entries.

Voting

References 

1975
Countries in the Eurovision Song Contest 1975
Eurovision
Eurovision